Květa Hrušková (25 June 1925 - 30 January 2012) was a female Czech international table tennis player.

She won five World Table Tennis Championship medals during the 1949 World Table Tennis Championships and 1951 World Table Tennis Championships.

See also
 List of table tennis players
 List of World Table Tennis Championships medalists

References

1925 births
2012 deaths
Czech female table tennis players
World Table Tennis Championships medalists